Jonathan Banks (born January 31, 1947) is an American actor. His first notable film roles were in the films Airplane! (1980), 48 Hrs. (1982), and Beverly Hills Cop (1984). He has received critical acclaim for his role as Mike Ehrmantraut in the television series Breaking Bad (2009–2012), its spin-off series Better Call Saul (2015–2022), and its sequel film, El Camino: A Breaking Bad Movie (2019). He is also known for his breakthrough role as Frank McPike in Wiseguy (1987–1990).

He has received six Primetime Emmy Award nominations for Outstanding Supporting Actor in a Drama Series (1989, 2013, 2015–2017, 2019) for his work on all three series, making him the only actor with nominations as a main cast member for all three shows in this category, two of which feature him as the same character.

Filmography

Film

Television films

Television series

Video games

References 

American filmographies
Male actor filmographies